Walking Tall: The Payback is a 2007 American action-thriller film, released direct-to-video as a stand-alone sequel to the 2004 film Walking Tall. Directed by Tripp Reed, it stars Kevin Sorbo, A.J. Buckley, Haley Ramm, Bentley Mitchum, Jennifer Sipes, Brad Leland, Charles Baker and Marc Macaulay.

The film has a western theme with country and western music used in its score, representing a cliché story from western movies in a modern setting. Its main character's name is Nick Prescott, unlike the original's Buford Pusser or the remake's Chris Vaughn.

Plot
Ex-military Nick returns to his hometown. His father, who is the sheriff tries to stand up against a brutal gang of ruthless criminals who intimidate and blackmail the people to sell them their business. He is then killed by the gang's leader Harvey Morris. With the help of an FBI agent and a few old friends, Nick himself becomes the sheriff, then vows to do everything in his power to destroy the gang and their ruthless leader, and win back his city. Eventually he shoots Morris and his gang and becomes the new sheriff of his hometown

Cast
 Kevin Sorbo as Nick Prescott
 Haley Ramm as Samantha Jensen
 Richard Dillard as Charlie Prescott
 Gail Cronauer as Emma Prescott
 Ntokozo Mntwini as Hap Worrell
 A.J. Buckley as Harvey Morris
 Bentley Mitchum as Walter Morris
 Yvette Nipar as Agent Kate Jensen
 Jennifer Sipes as Crystal Martin
 Todd Terry as Lou Dowdy
 Jerry Cotton as Traxell Byrne
 John S. Davies as Detective Pete Michaels
 Richard Nance as Frank Boggs
 Marc Macaulay as Herb Sherman
 Brad Leland as Mitch
 David Frye as Howie
 Craig Erickson as Jack Simms
 Jackson Hurst as Hank
 Charles Baker as Nate

Controversy
There was some controversy before this film's release, as Dwana Pusser (daughter of Buford Pusser) released a statement on her website condemning this movie and its upcoming sequel, saying "I have read the scripts and they are very vulgar. As a Christian woman I am very upset with the direction the movies have taken."

References

External links
 

Walking Tall (films)
2007 direct-to-video films
2007 films
2007 action thriller films
American action thriller films
Direct-to-video sequel films
2000s English-language films
Films directed by Tripp Reed
2000s American films